Nothing to Lose: Music from and Inspired by the Motion Picture is the soundtrack to the 1997 comedy film, Nothing to Lose. It was released on July 1, 1997 through Tommy Boy Records. The soundtrack was very successful, peaking at #12 on the Billboard 200 and #5 on the Top R&B/Hip-Hop Albums and was certified gold on September 3, 1997. Two singles also found success, Lil' Kim's "Not Tonight" went to #6 on the Billboard Hot 100 and was certified platinum, while Coolio's "C U When U Get There" went to #12 on the Billboard Hot 100 and was certified gold.

Track listing

Charts

Weekly charts

Year-end charts

References

Comedy film soundtracks
1997 soundtrack albums
Albums produced by Daz Dillinger
Albums produced by Soopafly
Albums produced by Teddy Riley
Tommy Boy Records soundtracks
Warner Records soundtracks